Thomas Cecil, Earl of Exeter, Lord Burghley and minister to Elizabeth I of England.

Thomas Cecil may also refer to:

Thomas Cecil (engraver), English engraver who flourished about 1630
Lord Thomas Cecil (1797–1873), British peer and member of Parliament for Stamford
Tommy Cecil, musician who worked with Cyro Baptista

See also
 
 Cecil Thomas (disambiguation)